The Pit River Tribe is a federally recognized tribe of eleven bands of indigenous peoples of California. They primarily live along the Pit River in the northeast corner of California. Their name also is spelled as "Pitt River" in some historical records.

Bands

The eleven bands are as follows:

 Achomawi (Achumawi, Ajumawi)
Aporidge
Astariwawi (Astarawi)
Atsuge (Atsugewi)
Atwamsini
Hanhawi (Hammawi)
Hewisedawi
Ilmawi
Itsatawi
Kosalextawi (Kosalektawi)
Madhesi

Languages
The eleven bands of the Pit River Tribe originally spoke two related languages, nine of them speaking Achumawi and two speaking Atsugewi (Atsuge and Apwaruke). They are closely related and are classified as the Palaihnihan family of languages, with uncertain external relations.

Most members of the tribe now speak English. Achumawi is critically endangered, and Atsugewi is extinct.

Population centers
The tribe is spread across several locations in Shasta County and Modoc County:

 Big Bend Rancheria, Shasta County, 40 acres, population: 10
 Likely Rancheria, Modoc County, 1.32 acres, tribal cemetery
 Lookout Rancheria, Modoc County, 40 acres, population: 10
 Montgomery Creek Rancheria, Shasta County, 72 acres, population: 15
 Roaring Creek Rancheria, Shasta County, 80 acres, population: 14
 XL Ranch, Modoc County, 9,254.86 acres, population: 40.

The tribe also owns trust lands in Lake County, California, Lassen, Mendocino, Modoc, and Shasta Counties.

Government
The tribe conducts business from Burney, California. They were officially recognized as a tribe in 1976 and ratified their constitution in 1987. Each of the eleven bands is represented in the tribal council.

Constitution of the Pit River Tribe and claims

In August 1964, a Constitution was formally adopted by the Pit River Tribe. The Preamble states:"... for the purpose of securing our Rights and Powers inherent in our Sovereign status as reinforced by the laws of the United States, developing and protecting Pit River (Ajumawi - Atsugewi) ancestral lands and all other resources, preserving peace and order in our community, promoting the general welfare of our people and our descendants, protecting the rights of the Tribe and of our members, and preserving our land base, culture and identity, ..." While the Pit River group originally filed a separate land claims, after the Indian Claims Commission was created in 1946, the Pit River tribe was encouraged in 1963 to participate in the larger claims—Indians of California vs U. S. – but ultimately there was disharmony within the tribe and they rejected their monetary award.

History

Overview of Some Prehistoric and Historic Events and Periods:

Approximately 200 AD: New technology, the bow and arrow, is introduced into the Pit River area.

Pre-1800 - Pit River bands of indigenous natives were living in abundance for thousands of years. For thousands of years, numerous indigenous villages were situated around and along Achoma (the Pit River) and out onto the surrounding plains, hills, mountains, and valleys. The people utilized the natural resources of their land to the fullest. In addition to harvesting deer, salmon, trout, rabbit, birds, and other small mammals, they often moved around their territory and gathered acorns, roots, herbs, and fruits, as each came into their season.

Before the European-American immigration, the Native Americans of the Pit River region were thriving. The eleven bands in the region had similarities and differences in their language and ways. Some downriver bands lived in simple pit houses in small familial villages along Achoma (aka, the Pit River). They led a somewhat nomadic life, following opportunities to harvest foods from the rich resources of this valley, and ready to move to higher ground when the creeks and rivers flooded in the rainy season. Archaeological evidence and some information collected by ethnographers in the early 1900s gives only minimal details of the thriving culture and communities that existed in the vast Pit River territory.

Pit River artists and craftspeople apparently used both basalt and much obsidian from Glass Mountain to make tools and weapons.  Obsidian arrowheads and obsidian flakes from tool-making have been found all over the valley from the river banks to the hillsides and high in mountain hunting camp areas.

1827-1830s - European-American/Canadian fur trappers and explorers began passing through the Pit River area

1830s - Many Pit River natives died from imported disease epidemics.

1848 - California became part of U.S.A. through Treaty of Hidalgo with Mexico (in 1850 California became a state).

1849- Gold Rush begins, bringing a new huge wave of migrants into California, many of whom were ruthless abusers and murderers of Indian people.

1851-53 - U.S. Congress and California Legislature created various laws that denied Indians land rights and effectively extinguished all aboriginal title in the state, paving the way for continued conflict, with no treaties or protections for the Pit River Indians.

1850s and 1860s:  
The movement of white emigrants into Pit River territory caused more and more Pit River displacement and changes to the environment. The emigrants often had no respect for the delicate balance of nature, grazing their cattle and horses in prime hunting and gathering areas.  A steady flow of emigrants arrived determined to occupy Pit River land and began the process of confiscating and fencing off the land.

1850s - European-American immigrant expansion interest and activity in Pit River region began. USA government, military forces, and settlers invaded, attacked, displaced, and killed the majority of Pit River Indians, with no treaties or compensation made for land seized.

Regionally (intensifying in the mid 1850s), the European invaders ruthlessly and tragically destroyed most of the Pit River natives, and their way of life. The Pit Rivers (and virtually all California indigenous bands) were repeatedly abused, killed, and brutally massacred, as the invaders raided village after village in countless incidents, including some more well-known battles, such as the "Wintoon War" and the "Pit River War"...

Here is one account of some of those ruthless attacks: "War was declared on the Indians in 1858. General William Kibbe and Captain I. G. Messec led military and civilian soldiers against the Indians from Trinity County all the way to the Fall River Valley. These soldiers were known as Kibbe's Guards and were ruthless, efficient Indian killers."  Many Indians surrendered under the threat of death or starvation, others were captured, untold numbers were killed, and their villages and food supplies were destroyed in the battles.

In 1859, 700 captured Pit River Indians were forcibly taken to the Round Valley Reservation in Mendocino County for internment. The number of soldiers reported killed in the attacks varies; one account mentions 25, while another mentions 90.  The main war ended in 1859.  Although the vast majority of Pit River Indians had been killed or forcibly moved out of the area, some remained, hidden away, and over 500 of those who were sent away eventually returned to their homeland, only to find white settlers taking over more and more property.

By 1868, the US Army under General George Crook took control of many upriver Achoma areas.  Many stories of brutal massacres and senseless racist killings of Pit River people have been handed down through the oral tradition.  The Pit River area was also impacted by economic factors. Government timber land went on sale in 1878, and allowed the purchase of up to 160 acres at $2.50 an acre.  Outlying areas were victim to a speculative boom as a result, and large tracts of land passed into private hands.  The area was subsequently heavily logged. The over-harvesting of timber in Big Bend region remains an ecological problem today.  Most of the once vast and diverse forests in the area have been destroyed by clear-cutting and other industrial logging practices and replaced by tree farms.

The arrival of European-American settlers and the occupation of the Pit River territories disrupted the safety of the Pit River people and their traditional food supply.  The Pit River people never signed a treaty with the United States or the State of California; their land was simply illegally confiscated. Many "Pit Rivers" were displaced against their will, and some were murdered for their land. Some returned or resettled nearby when they could, but countless people were cut off from their extended families and their traditional food sources. Into the 1900s, many Pit River people survived in poverty and some were hired out as ranch hands, mill workers, forestry workers, and other forms of manual labor.

Today, the Pit River people continue to live in what is now called Shasta County, as well as throughout the West.  Some continue to hunt and gather in their traditional places, and pray at their sacred sites throughout their homeland. They are a federally recognized tribe (headquarters located in Burney, CA) with a  tribal council that includes representation of each of the eleven bands making up the Pit River Nation. The tribe operates several "Rancheria" and allotment "satellite" reservations, a casino, a gas station and convenience store, and a large commercial cannabis growing facility which was raided by US and California drug agents in July 2015.

Ethnobotany
They would use amelanchier to create a sort of body armor, the wood was made into a heavy robe or overcoat and corset armor and used for fighting. Members of the Pit River tribe would also sell taxus brevifolia to the Ukiah.

The bulbs dug from meadows and acorns from oaks were an important source of food. A ground up form of these plants were stored for winter use.

A full list of Atsugewi plants can be found at http://naeb.brit.org/uses/tribes/19/ (68 documented uses).

Notable members
Jean LaMarr, artist
Darryl Babe Wilson, writer and storyteller

See also
Pitt River Expedition
Shasta people — also indigenous peoples of the Pit River basin.

Notes

References
 Pritzker, Barry M. A Native American Encyclopedia: History, Culture, and Peoples. Oxford: Oxford University Press, 2000.

External links

 
 Constitution of the Pit River Tribe

 01
Native American tribes in California
Federally recognized tribes in the United States
Pit River
Lake County, California
Lassen County, California
Native American tribes in Mendocino County, California
Modoc County, California
Shasta County, California